14 The Terrace, Barnes is a Grade II listed house at The Terrace, Barnes, London SW13, facing the River Thames, built as one of a pair with No 13 in the mid-eighteenth century.

Dame Ninette de Valois (1898–2001), dancer, teacher, choreographer, and director of classical ballet, lived there from 1962 to 1982.  A blue plaque is fixed to the front of the house.

References

External links

1700s establishments in England
Barnes, London
Grade II listed houses in London
Houses in the London Borough of Richmond upon Thames
Grade II listed buildings in the London Borough of Richmond upon Thames
The Terrace, Barnes